Michael or Mike Jeffries may refer to:

Michael Jeffries (singer), American rhythm and blues singer
Mike Jeffries (CEO) (born 1944), former chairman and chief executive officer of Abercrombie & Fitch Co
Mike Jeffries (soccer) (born 1962), retired American soccer player and current soccer coach
Mike Jeffries (comics), better known as Turbo, a character in Marvel Comics

See also
Mike Jefferies, British screenwriter and film producer
Michael Jeffrey (born 1971), football player
Michael Jeffery (disambiguation)